Polonaise sauce is a sauce that originated in Poland and became popular in France in the 18th century. The sauce consists of melted butter, chopped boiled eggs, bread crumbs, salt, lemon juice and herbs such as thyme, basil and parsley. It is poured over cooked or steamed vegetables, most notably cauliflower, asparagus, wax beans and broccoli. Velouté à la polonaise is a wholly different sauce.

Preparation methods and ingredients differ among cooks. Variations include adding horseradish, sour cream, yoghurt, or kefir.

References

Polish cuisine
French sauces
Food and drink decorations
Horseradish (condiment)